Serra de Itabaiana National Park is a national park in the state of Sergipe, Brazil.

Location

It was created on 15 June 2005, and is administered by the Chico Mendes Institute for Biodiversity Conservation.
The park covers parts of the Areia Branca, Campo do Brito, Itabaiana, Itaporanga d'Ajuda, Laranjeiras and Malhador municipalities of  the state of Sergipe.

Conservation

The park is classified as IUCN protected area category II (national park).
It has the objectives of preserving natural ecosystems of great ecological relevance and scenic beauty, enabling scientific research, environmental education, outdoors recreation and eco-tourism.

The lizard Cnemidophorus abaetensis is a protected species found in the park.

Notes

Sources

2005 establishments in Brazil
National parks of Brazil
Protected areas of Sergipe
Protected areas of the Atlantic Forest